Samiha Naili was a female Egyptian international table tennis player.

She won double bronze at the 1939 World Table Tennis Championships in the women's singles and women's doubles.

See also
 List of table tennis players
 List of World Table Tennis Championships medalists

References

Egyptian female table tennis players
World Table Tennis Championships medalists